Lawndale is an unincorporated community in Prairie View Township, Wilkin County, Minnesota, United States.

The community is located between Rothsay and Barnesville at the junction of County Road 30 and County Road 52.

Lawndale is immediately west of the junction of Interstate 94 and State Highway 108 / County 30.

References

Rand McNally Road Atlas - 2007 edition - Minnesota entry
Official State of Minnesota Highway Map - 2007/2008 edition

Unincorporated communities in Minnesota
Unincorporated communities in Wilkin County, Minnesota